The Meghamalai rock gecko (Hemidactylus vanam) is a species of gecko. It is endemic to Tamil Nadu in India.

References

Hemidactylus
Reptiles described in 2018
Endemic fauna of India
Reptiles of India